Gary G. Suiter (January 18, 1944 – October 23, 1982) was an American professional basketball player.

Suiter was a 6'9" center from Midwestern State University, and played for the Mustangs from 1966 to 1969. Suiter had previously attended the University of New Mexico in the fall of 1962 on a basketball scholarship, but transferred after numerous disciplinary reasons. 

He played one season (1970–71) in the National Basketball Association as a member of the Cleveland Cavaliers, and averaged 1.4 points in 30 games.

Suiter was ranked the 2nd "Most Colorful Cavalier Player" by the Plain Dealer.

Suiter was the first person from Albuquerque to play for the National Basketball Association.

Early life 
Suiter was born in Omaha, Nebraska, on January 18, 1942. Suiter attended Sandia High School, where he played at the center and power forward positions. Suiter was a unanimous All-State selection his senior season, and was the only New Mexico selection for the high school All-American team. In his senior season, he was recruited by Kentucky, Kansas State, Texas Western (now UTEP), Arizona, Arizona State, Idaho State, Brigham Young University, New Mexico State University, Texas Tech, the University of Washington, Pepperdine, and the University of New Mexico.

College 
Bob King (basketball), the University of New Mexico’s legendary basketball architect, said Suiter was, “one of the best freshman prospects he had ever seen.”

Suiter accepted the University of New Mexico’s offer, however, Suiter did not play past the fall semester. There were multiple reasons for Suiter's dismissal; he was previously asked to move out of the dormitories and was having scholastic difficulties. He was often late for practices and study halls. He had a hoarding issue, and would collect pizza boxes, Beatles vinyl, and MAD Magazines. Bob King was upset to see Suiter leave the program, but would take him back if he, “clears up his many problems.”

Suiter enrolled at Midwestern State University in the fall of 1966. Suiter hitchhiked from New Mexico to Wichita Falls and called Midwestern State's coach Dennis Vinzant asking for a tryout. After sitting out a year due to transfer rules, he played a total of 2 years for the Mustangs. In his junior year Suiter played in 11 games, averaging a double-double, with 14.8 points per a game and 10 rebounds per a game on average. Suiter's senior year saw more productivity; he started all 28 games and again averaged a double-double. Suiter averaged 22.1 points per a game, and pulled in 15.4 rebounds per a game. He was not selected in the 1969 NBA draft.

Professional career

Cleveland Cavaliers (1970-1971) 
Suiter tried out for the Cleveland Cavaliers in 1970. He, "appeared one day with a armload of films, and made the team by blocking two shots of a disinterested Connie Hawkins at an exhibition game." He played in 30 games and averaged 1.4 points. He only played 14 minutes that season, and was nearly cut at halftime of the first game. Suiter was cut midway through the 1970-1971 season, because he, "was found in full uniform in the stands munching hot dogs."

Philadelphia 76ers (1973) 
Suiter was cut by the 76ers in September, 1973, after making the team a month before.

Later Life 
Suiter was arrested over a $175 shoplifting accusation. Because of the overcrowding of jails in Albuquerque, Suiter was incarcerated at the Penitentiary of New Mexico. He was incarcerated just 8 days before the New Mexico State penitentiary riots took place, the most violent prison riot in U.S. history. Suiter was beaten with a metal pipe and other bludgeons by inmates that were intoxicated. Suiter suffered lacerations, contusions, and fractures. He claimed his leg was permanently impaired. Suiter ended up suing the state, and won due to the prisons lack of adequate security.  Albert Jerome Romero pleaded guilty for assault against Suiter, and was sentenced to 18 months in prison.

Gambling issues 
Suiter was known to be a gambler, and often hustled at pool halls around New Mexico and Texas. He was, "a fairly good pool player and you could find him in the pool halls during the day and then on the 3 by 6 bar tables at night." Suiter began his gambling issue inside the University of New Mexico's Student Union Building. The breaking point of Suiter being kicked out of UNM was because he was caught playing pool wearing the football coaches' letterman jacket that he stole.  

A year before his murder, Suiter was robbed of $2,500 and a diamond ring by a business owner. The business owner and Suiter had been playing Craps, and after Suiter had won $2,500, the business owner brandished a pistol and shot at Suiter.

Death 
On October 23, 1982, Suiter was murdered near Rio Rancho, New Mexico, after an argument over a $275 gambling debt. After finding Suiter at a local Mexican restaurant, Gary Randall Hoxsie and John Waters lured Suiter to a place known as North Beach, on the banks of the Rio Grande a few miles north of Corrales. Suiter originally believed that a Craps game would be taking place. After a heated argument, Gary Randall Hoxsie shot Suiter in the hand, chest, and head at close range with a .375 Magnum. Suiter’s body was found the next morning by two duck hunters. In 1983, Gary Randall Hoxsie was sentenced to life in prison for killing Suiter.

Notes

1945 births
1982 deaths
American men's basketball players
Centers (basketball)
Cleveland Cavaliers players
Deaths by firearm in New Mexico
Male murder victims
Midwestern State Mustangs men's basketball players
People murdered in New Mexico
Undrafted National Basketball Association players